The 2020 King George VI and Queen Elizabeth Stakes was a horse race held at Ascot Racecourse on Saturday 25 July 2020. It was the 70th running of the King George VI and Queen Elizabeth Stakes.

The winner was Enable, a six-year-old bay mare trained at Newmarket by John Gosden, ridden by Frankie Dettori and owned by Khalid Abdullah. Enable's victory was a record-equalling seventh in the race for Dettori, the fifth for Gosden and the fourth for Khalid Abdullah. Enable became the first horse to win the King George three times, and the second six-year-old to win the race after Swain in 1998. The race was contested by only three runners, the smallest field in the event's history.

Race details
 Sponsor: QIPCO
 Purse: £400,000; First prize: £226,840
 Surface: Turf
 Going: Good to Firm
 Distance: 12 furlongs
 Number of runners: 3
 Winner's time: 2:28.92

Full result

Winner's details
Further details of the winner, Enable
 Sex: Mare
 Foaled: 12 February 2014
 Country: United Kingdom
 Sire: Nathaniel
 Owner: Khalid Abullah
 Breeder: Juddmonte Farms

References

See also
2020 British Champions Series

King George
 2020
King George VI and Queen Elizabeth Stakes
2020s in Berkshire
King George VI